Squeeze a Flower is a 1970 Australian comedy film directed by Marc Daniels and starring Walter Chiari.

Plot
Brother George is the only monk at the Italian Monastery who knows the secret recipe of the popular liqueur that is the sole source of income for the monastery. When he feels their sole distributor, a local wine merchant, is not giving the monastery a fair price, he leaves and moves to Australia. There he works at a vineyard picking grapes and starts making the liqueur in his spare time.

George then comes to the attention of the winery owner Alfredo Brazzi and the two agree to a partnership to make the liqueur. Alfredo is unaware George is a monk and that he sends 50 percent of the money back to his Italian monastery.

Alfredo and his son-in-law Tim constantly try to steal the secret recipe. They recruit June for their skulduggery, but she falls in love with George, also unaware of his religious calling. Finally, the Italian wine merchant travels to Sydney, willing to make a deal with Brother George. The merchant ends up paying double the price he had previously rejected.

Cast
 Walter Chiari – Brother George
 Jack Albertson – Alfredo Brazzi
 Rowena Wallace – June Phillips
 Dave Allen – Tim O'Mahoney
 Kirrily Nolan – Maria O'Mahoney
 Alec Kellaway – The Abbot
Michael Laurence – Brother James
Alan Tobin – Brother Peter
Charles McCallum – Brother Sebastian
Harry Lawrence – Vequis
Roger Ward – Bosun
Harry Britton – Photographer
Alex Mozart – Truck Driver
Sandy Harbutt – Grape Picker
Amanda Irving – Grape Picker
Jeff Ashby – Bert Andrews
Penny Sugg – Stewardess
Sue Lloyd – Receptionist
Barry Crocker – Waiter
Lea Denfield – Flower Seller
Pat Sullivan – Laboratory Assistant
Bobby Limb - Bobby Lambert
Dawn Lake - Dawn Lambert

Production
The film was meant to be the first in a proposed series of ten films made jointly by NLT Productions and Group W. NLT Productions was a television production company in Sydney and was supported by Motion Picture Investments, a company associated with various Australian businessmen including Sir Reginald Ansett. Group W was a division of the American Westinghouse Broadcasting Company.

Leading cast and crew were imported: the director, writer and producer were all American and the lead actors were from overseas: Italian Walter Chiari, American Jack Albertson and Irish David Allen. It was Allen's first major film role.

Filming began in mid February 1969 and only took a month. Shooting took place in the studio of Ajax Films in Sydney and on location in St Patrick's College, Manly, and Mount Pleasant vineyard in the Hunter Valley.

Walter Chiari had previously made They're a Weird Mob (1966) in Australia. He married his girlfriend during the shoot.

Release
The film's premiere in Sydney was attended by Australian Prime Minister John Gorton but the movie was not well received, commercially or critically.

References

External links

Squeeze a Flower at National Film and Sound Archive
Squeeze a Flower at Oz Movies

Australian comedy films
1970 films
Films directed by Marc Daniels
1970s English-language films